Kagome metal is a ferromagnetic quantum material that was first used in literature in 2011 for a compound of . However, this material had been created for several decades. In this material, metal atoms are arranged in a lattice resembling the Japanese kagome basket weaving pattern. The same material has also been termed as "kagome magnet" since 2018. Kagome metal (or magnets) refer to a new class of magnetic quantum materials hosting kagome lattice and topological band structure. They include 3-1 materials (example: antiferromagnet ), 1-1 materials (example: paramagnet ), 1-6-6 materials (example: ferrimagnet ), 3-2-2 materials (example: hard ferromagnet ), and 3-2 materials (example: soft ferromagnet ), thus demonstrating a variety of crystal and magnetic structures. They generally feature a 3d transition metal based magnetic kagome lattice with an in-plane lattice constant ~5.5 Å. Their 3d electrons dominate the low-energy electronic structure in these quantum materials, thus exhibiting electronic correlation. Crucially, the kagome lattice electrons generally feature Dirac band crossings and flat band, which are the source for nontrivial band topology. Moreover, they all contain the heavy element , which can provide strong spin-orbit coupling to the system. Therefore, this is an ideal system to explore the rich interplay between geometry, correlation, and topology.

In the Kagome structure, atoms are arranged into layered sets of overlapping triangles so that there exist large empty hexagonal spaces. Electrons in the metal experience a "three-dimensional cousin of the quantum Hall effect". The inherent magnetism of the metal and the quantum-mechanical magnetism induce electrons to flow around the edges of the triangular crystals, akin to superconductivity. Unlike superconductivity, this structure and behavior is stable at room temperature. Other structures were shown to exhibit the quantum hall effect at very low temperatures with an external magnetic field as high as 1 million times the strength that of the earth. By building metal out of a ferromagnetic material, that exterior magnetic field was no longer necessary, and the quantum Hall effect persists into room temperature.

The Kagome alloy  displayed several exotic quantum electronic behaviors that add to its quantum topology. The lattice harbors massive Dirac fermions, Berry curvature, band gaps, and spin-orbit activity, all of which are conducive to the Hall Effect and zero energy loss electric currents. The new class of Kagome metals AV3Sb5 (A = Cs, Rb, K) were also discovered in 2019, with CsV3Sb5 found to possess numerous exotic properties, including superconductivity, topological states, and other exotic phenomena.

Development

March 2018 experiment 
The experiment published in Nature was led by Linda Ye and Mingu Kang from the Massachusetts Institute of Technology Department of Physics. The other researches published in the article were: Junwei Liu (MIT), Felix von Cube (Harvard), Christina R. Wicker (MIT), Takehito Suzuki (MIT), Chris Jozwiak (Berkeley Labs), Aaron Bostwick (Berkeley Labs), Eli Rotenberg (Berkeley Labs), David C. Bell (Harvard), Liang Fu (MIT), Riccardo Comin (MIT), and Joseph G. Checkelsky (MIT).

The team constructed a Kagome lattice using an iron and tin alloy . When  is heated to about 750℃ (1380 °F), the alloy naturally assumes a Kagome lattice structure. To maintain this structure at room temperature, the team cooled it in an ice bath. The resulting structure had iron atoms at the corners of each triangle surrounding tin atoms, the tin atoms stabilizing the large empty hexagonal space.

The photo-electronic structure of this metal was mapped at Lawrence Berkeley National Lab's Advanced Light Source beamlines 7.0.2 MAESTRO and 4.0.3 MERLIN. The measurements taken here mapped the band structures of the metal under a current and showed “the double-Dirac-cone structure corresponding to Dirac Fermions”. A 30 meV gap between cones was shown, which is indicative of the Hall effect and massive Dirac fermions.

The experiment was published in Nature on March 19, 2018.

Expansions upon the 2018 experiment 
According to an article published by the team on October 25, 2019 in Nature Communications, the lattice was shown to exhibit spin-orbit coupling de Haas van Alphen oscillations and Fermi surfaces. The team also continued to modify the structure of the metal, and in an article published in Nature Materials on December 9, 2019, they found that  in a 1 to 1 ratio exhibited a more “ideal” lattice. The two-dimensional layers with iron and tin in the kagome shape were separated by a layer entirely of tin, allowing them to have separate band structures. This structure showed both massive Dirac fermions and electronic band structures where electrons do not occur.

Spintronic application

Magnetic skyrmion 
Magnetic skyrmionic bubbles have been found in Kagome metals over a wide temperature range.

Recent studies have shown that, by breaking geometric symmetry ( such as thickness), the magnetic skyrmion in  can be nucleated by varying in-plane fields within 5-10 mT.

See also 
Herbertsmithite, a natural mineral with kagome lattice at the atomic scale
Magnon

Further reading

References 

2018 in science
Materials